Nyctimystes intercastellus is a species of tree frog in the sub-family Pelodryadinae, endemic to Papua New Guinea.  It has been found on three of the D'Entrecasteaux Islands: Fergusson Island, Normanby Island, and Goodenough Island.

This frog measures 3.9 to 5.1 cm in snout-vent length.  It has more webbing on its feet than is typical for tree frogs.

References

Amphibians described in 2012
Frogs of Asia
intercastellus